Castle Meyenburg is in Meyenburg and was built by the Von Rohrs.  It was built in the 14th century and currently houses a fashion museum and a room devoted to the history of the Von Rohrs.  The structure was renovated and developed by the architect Friedrich Adler in the 19th century.

References

Manor houses in Germany
Buildings and structures in Prignitz
Buildings and structures completed in the 14th century